Vitaliy Romanchukevych (born January 28, 1985) is a Ukrainian banker, Doctor of Economic Sciences; chairman of the Board of  European Industrial Bank; First vice president of the Association of Ukrainian Bank; judge of the Arbitration Court of AUB, worked at the National Bank of Ukraine more than 10 years.

Biography 
Vitaly Romanchukevych was born on January 28, 1985, in Dolyna, Prykarpattia. Studied at Dolyna Secondary School No. 4 and Dolyna Natural and Mathematical Lyceum at the Faculty of Physics and Mathematics.

In 2007, he graduated with honors with MA in banking from the Lviv Institute of Banking, and a year earlier he got a BA degree in business economics. He also obtained a higher education in law at the correspondence department of the Lviv State University of Internal Affairs.

In 2011, he graduated from the NBU University of Banking, specializing in "Money, Finance and Credit".

In 2012, he received the scientific degree as a candidate of economic sciences, the topic of his dissertation was "Monetary and credit policy of Ukraine in the conditions of the globalization of the economy."

In 2013, he earned a master's degree in "Social Development Management" at the Institute of Senior Managers of the National Academy of Public Administration under the President of Ukraine.

In 2014, he entered doctoral studies at the University of Banking.

In 2020, he defended his dissertation research on the topic "Modernization of the State Financial Policy of Sustainable Development" and received the scientific degree of Doctor of Economic Sciences. He continues to engage in scientific research, has more than 32 scientific papers.

He also studied and gained practical experience in the European Central Bank, Frankfurt, Germany, The Central Bank of the Russian Federation, Tula, Russian Federation, Joint Vienna Institute JVI IMF, Vienna, Austria; School of State Policy named after Lee Kuan Yew, National University of Singapore; 2021S UCGA Board Direction. Education program in corporate governance is a joint INSEAD and UCGA project. Board Direction is therefore based upon best practices and case studies from INSEAD, London Business School and Harvard, ICA International Certificate in Compliance and in AML, Introductory Level, etc.

Career 

 12.2021 — Chairman of the Board of European Industrial Bank; 
 05.2019 — First vice-president of the Association of Ukrainian Bank
 02.2018 — 07.2021— First Deputy Chairman of the management board of JSC "Industrialbank", member of the management board.
 2015 — 2018 — Head of the Department of Monetary and Credit Market Analysis of the Department of Monetary Policy and Economic Analysis of the NBU.
 08.2013 — 02.2015 — Deputy Head of the Department of Monetary Market Analysis and Forecasting of the General Department of Monetary Policy of the NBU.
 02.2009 — 07.2013 — Chief Economist of the Department of Monetary Market Analysis and Forecasting of the General Department of Monetary and Credit Policy of the NBU.
 12.2007 — 02.2009 — Economist of the 1st category of the Department of Regulation of Monetary and Credit and Stock Markets of the Department of Monetary Policy of the NBU.

Awards 

 Person of the Year-2019 in the nomination "Financier of the Year"
 Banker of the Year 2018 in Ukraine

References

External links 
 Google Scholar
 National bank of Ukraine

Ukrainian bankers
1985 births
Living people